Crazy Eyes is a 2012 independent film co-written and directed by Adam Sherman.

Plot
Zack (Haas) is a young, divorced father who starts to develop romantic feelings towards his friend Rebecca (Zima), whom he refers to as "Crazy Eyes". He spends a lot of time at a bar run by his best friend Dan Drake (Busey) and hanging out with Autumn (Raymonde). As he pursues a sexual relationship with Rebecca, Zack grows increasingly aware of the importance of his son's role in his life amidst the failing health of his own father.

Cast

Critical reception
From Geoff Henao of Flixist:

References

External links 
 
 

American comedy films
American independent films
2012 films
2012 comedy films
2012 independent films
2010s English-language films
2010s American films